M/V Bartlett was a ferry vessel for the Alaska Marine Highway servicing Prince William Sound. The 193-foot-long Bartlett was built for the Alaska Marine Highway System in 1968 by Jeffboat Inc. of Jeffersonville, Ind., for $3.25 million. It was retired in 2003 due to impending regulations which would have required substantial and expensive upgrades.

It was sold on eBay in August 2003 to Lloyd Cannon, president of All Alaskan Seafoods and donated to the Seattle Maritime Academy. The closing price was $389,500.

External links
 
 
 

1968 ships
Former Alaska Marine Highway System vessels
Ships built in Jeffersonville, Indiana